is a Japanese visual novel producing company which mainly deals in the porting of adult games for the consumer port PlayStation 2 and removing the erotic content in effect. Yeti produced their first original work in December 2007 entitled Myself ; Yourself.

Games
Dear My Friend: Love Like Powdery Snow, released April 28, 2005; originally by Light.
Kon Neko: Keep a Memory Green, released October 27, 2005; originally by Marmalade.
Tamayura: Mitama Okuri no Shi, released June 29, 2006; originally by Akabeisoft2.
Sekai no Subete: Two of Us, released September 28, 2006; originally by Tamasoft
Myself ; Yourself, released December 20, 2007; original work by Yeti
Koihime Musō,  released in spring 2008; originally by BaseSon
Secret Game: Killer Queen, released in spring 2008; originally by Flat.
Root Double: Before Crime * After Days, released in June 2012, original work by Yeti.
Rebellions: Secret Game 2nd Stage, released in March 2013, originally by Flat.Furuiro Meikyuu Rondo ~Histoire de Destin~, will be released sometime in 2013, originally by Yatagarasu.

Canceled TitlesSharin no Kuni, Himawari no Shōjo'', originally by Akabeisoft2.
Canceled due to 5pb. publishing it for Xbox 360.

External links
Official website 

Amusement companies of Japan
Video game companies of Japan